The 2006 United Kingdom Budget, officially known as Budget 2006: A strong and strengthening economy: Investing in Britain's future was formally delivered by Chancellor of the Exchequer Gordon Brown in the House of Commons on 22 March 2006.

Details

Taxes

Spending

References

United Kingdom budget
Budget
Gordon Brown
United Kingdom budgets